The Australian women's cricket team toured Ireland between 28 June to 2 July 1987 to contest a three match WODI series. In this, Ireland's debut WODI series, Australia won each match by a margin of more than 100 runs.

ODI series

1st ODI

2nd ODI

3rd ODI

References

International cricket competitions from 1985–86 to 1988
1987 in women's cricket
1987 in Australian cricket
1987 in Irish cricket
Ireland 1987
Australia 1987
cricket
cricket